Alain Bailey (born 14 August 1987) is a Jamaican long jumper.

He joined the Arkansas Razorbacks in 2007 and received All American honours on three occasions. He was seventh in the long jump at the outdoor NCAA Championships in 2009 and went on to win the event at the Jamaican Championships later that season. This gained him qualification into the 2009 World Championships in Athletics.

He competed at the World Championship long jump competition, but did not manage to reach the final. His personal best jump is 8.35 metres, achieved in May 2010 in Knoxville, Tennessee.

International competitions

References

1987 births
Living people
Jamaican male long jumpers
World Athletics Championships athletes for Jamaica
Arkansas Razorbacks men's track and field athletes
20th-century Jamaican people
21st-century Jamaican people